Paul Lemerle (22 April 1903 – 17 July 1989) was a French Byzantinist, born in Paris.

Biography
Lemerle taught at the École française d'Athènes (1931–1941), at the Faculté des Lettres of the University of Burgundy at Dijon (1942–1947), at the École Pratique des Hautes Études (1947–1968), at the Sorbonne (1958–1967) and at the Collège de France (1967–1973). He completed his doctoral dissertation in 1945, on the city of Philippi and eastern Macedonia during the Byzantine period.

He was the founding president of the International Association of Byzantine Studies (AIEB).

He died in Paris.

Works
 Le style byzantin. 1943.
 Philippes et la Macédoine orientale à l'époque chrétienne et byzantine. Thèse de doctorat, Paris, 1945.
 L'émirat d'Aydin, Byzance et l'Occident. 1957.
 Histoire de Byzance. 1960. Translated into English as A history of Byzantium. 1964.
 Élèves et professeurs à Constantinople au Xe siècle. 1969.
 Le premier humanisme byzantin. 1971. Translated into English as Byzantine humanism, the first phase. 1986. Translated into Russian as Первый византийский гуманизм. 2012.
 Cinq études sur le XIe siècle Byzantin. 1977.
 Le monde de Byzance. 1978.
 Les plus anciens recueils des miracles de Saint Démétrius et la pénétration des Slaves dans les Balkans. 1979.
 The agrarian history of Byzantium from the origins to the twelfth century. 1979.
 Essais sur le monde byzantin. 1980.

Sources
 
 

1903 births
1989 deaths
20th-century French historians
20th-century French male writers
Corresponding Fellows of the Medieval Academy of America
French Byzantinists
French male non-fiction writers
Writers from Paris